"Ghosts" is a 1997 song by American singer Michael Jackson, written, composed and produced by Jackson and Teddy Riley. It was released as part of "HIStory/Ghosts", a double A-side single with remixes of the song "HIStory" from Jackson's 1995 album as the second single from Blood on the Dance Floor: HIStory in the Mix. The Ghosts music video was a five-minute clip taken from a longer film, Michael Jackson's Ghosts. The song was a top five hit in the UK and Belgium.

Production, music and commentary
"Ghosts" was one of the five new tracks on the album. It was written, composed and produced by Michael Jackson and Teddy Riley. Instruments played on the track include a guitar and piano. Michael's vocals are dramatic and operatic. Jackson's vocal range on the song is E3-A5, the song is in the key of E dorian and at 103BPM . The Washington Post noted, "'Ghosts' is another new jack swing collaboration with Teddy Riley for a similarly short film. It is a bit unsettling, particularly when Jackson spits out this line: 'Who gave you the right to shake my family tree?'". Tom Sinclair of Entertainment Weekly, also highlighted those particular lyrics, speculating that "armchair psychologists will have a field day with the words".

The Dallas Morning News described "Ghosts" as an angry tale of a back-stabbing woman. Michael Saunders of The Boston Globe said that album cuts like "Is It Scary" and "Ghosts" "trample well-trodden ground". Sonia Murray of The Atlanta Journal and The Atlanta Constitution said of the track, "'Ghosts' pounds with funk until Jackson's weak vocals come in. Anthony Violanti of The Buffalo News said "Ghosts"...[is] programmed plastic soul that makes you wonder how someone as talented as Jackson can churn out such tracks. Jim Farber of New York Daily News said of the single "'Ghosts'...boast a few innovative sounds but no real melodies". Roger Catlin of The Hartford Courant stated, "The most intriguing pairing is 'Ghosts' and 'Is It Scary' in which he asks those who've only read about him in tabloids if he seems monstrous".

Jennifer Clay of Yahoo! Music noted that "Ghosts" sounded like material from the Thriller era. A longtime commentator on Jackson's public life, J. Randy Taraborrelli, gave a retrospective analysis of the album in the biography, The Magic & the Madness. Taraborrelli explained, "Several of the other songs on Blood are also memorable. 'Ghosts' stands out, perhaps because it's so evocative of Michael's spell-binding Ghosts long-styled video...it's classic, must-see Michael Jackson".

Short film
The music video for "Ghosts" was a five-minute cut-down of the short film of the same title, which Jackson unveiled at the Cannes Film Festival as part of the album promotion. It was released theatrically in the US in October 1996 and made its UK debut the following May at the Odeon Leicester Square. It was released on cassette in most parts of the world. The music video won the Bob Fosse Award for Best Choreography in a Music Video.

Written by Jackson and Stephen King and directed by Stan Winston, the short film was inspired by the isolation the singer felt after he was accused of child sexual abuse in 1993. It centers on the Maestro (Jackson), who is nearly chased out of his town by the residents and the mayor (also played by Michael Jackson, who intentionally resembles Tom Sneddon, a prosecutor in the 1993 and 2005 accusations) because they believe him to be a "freak". The film includes several songs and music videos from the albums HIStory and Blood on the Dance Floor: HIStory in the Mix. At over 38 minutes long, it held the Guinness World Records for the longest music video until 2013, when it was eclipsed by Pharrell Williams' "Happy". The short version is included in Michael Jackson's Vision.

Chart performance
"HIStory/Ghosts" generally did well in music charts worldwide, having charted within the top-ten and top-twenty in multiple countries. The song's highest peak position was in Italy, charting at number three. In the Netherlands, Belgium and Sweden "HIStory/Ghosts" spent seventeen to eighteen weeks on the charts. In Australia "HIStory/Ghosts" peaked at forty-three before falling off the chart. The single did not appear on any United States Billboard charts.

Track listing
CD single
 "HIStory" (7" HIStory Lesson Edit) – 4:08
 "HIStory" (Mark!'s Radio Edit) – 4:16
 "HIStory" (Mark!'s Vocal Club Mix) – 9:11
 "HIStory" (The Ummah Radio Mix) – 5:00
 "HIStory" (The Ummah DJ Mix) – 3:04
 "HIStory" (The Ummah Main A Cappella) – 4:06
 "Ghosts" (Radio Edit) – 3:50

12" single
 "Ghosts" (Mousse T's Club Mix) – 6:03
 "Ghosts" (Mousse T's Radio Rock) – 4:25
 "HIStory" (Tony Moran's HIStorical Dub) – 7:56
 "HIStory" (7" HIStory Lesson Edit) – 4:09

Remixes
Mousse T Mixes
 "Ghosts" (Mousse T's Club Mix) – 6:03
 "Ghosts" (Mousse T's Club Mix TV) – 6:03
 "Ghosts" (Mousse T's Radio Rock) – 4:25

Personnel
 Written, composed and produced by Michael Jackson with Teddy Riley
 Opera voice by Michael Jackson
 Engineered by Teddy Riley and Eddie DeLena
 Mixed by Dave Way
 Solo and background vocals, vocal arrangement and piano by Michael Jackson
 Teddy Riley, Brad Buxer and Doug Grigsby: Keyboards and synthesizers
 Matt Carpenter, Doug Grigsby, Andrew Scheps, Rob Hoffman and Alex Breuer: Drum programming
 Additional engineering by Bobby Brooks, Matt Forger, Andrew Scheps, Armand Volker and Albert Boekholt
 Assistant engineers: Tony Black, Mike Scotell, Greg Collins, Gerd Krenz, Patrick Ulenberg, Paul Dicato, Andy Strange, Rob Hoffman and Tom Bender

Charts

Weekly charts

Year-end charts

See also
 Michael Jackson's Ghosts

Notes

References
 George, Nelson (2004). Michael Jackson: The Ultimate Collection booklet. Sony BMG.
 
 

1997 songs
1997 singles
Songs about ghosts
Michael Jackson songs
Songs written by Michael Jackson
Song recordings produced by Teddy Riley
Song recordings produced by Michael Jackson
Songs written by Teddy Riley
Songs written for films
Music videos directed by Stan Winston